Jüri Vips (born 10 August 2000) is an Estonian professional racing driver who last competed in the FIA Formula 2 Championship with Hitech Grand Prix. He is the 2017 ADAC Formula 4 champion, and formerly a member of the Red Bull Junior Team.

Career

Karting 
Vips was born in Tallinn and began competitive karting in 2011 in his native Estonia. After winning the Rotax Junior Estonian Championship in 2013, Vips qualified for the 2014 Rotax Max Challenge Grand Finals in the Junior category, in which he claimed victory. He competed in the CIK-FIA European KF1 Championship in 2015, racing against future FIA Formula 3 competitors Richard Verschoor and Marcus Armstrong. Vips ended the championship in twelfth place.

Formula 4

In 2016, Vips made his car-racing debut in the Italian F4 and ADAC Formula 4 championships with Prema Powerteam. He finished sixth in ADAC Formula 4 and fifth in Italian F4, where he won the final race of the season and took the title of rookie champion. In the winter of 2016–17, Vips took part in the Indian-based MRF Challenge Formula 2000 Championship, taking three podium places and finishing sixth in the standings.

In 2017, Vips continued with Prema in Italian F4 and ADAC Formula 4. His appearances in Italian F4 were as a guest driver and he was ineligible to place in the championship, however he took two pole positions and a race victory at Mugello. In ADAC Formula 4, Vips was involved in a title fight with teammate Marcus Armstrong. Vips claimed the title in the final race at the Hockenheimring after pole-sitter Armstrong lost the lead of the race to Artem Petrov.

Formula 3 
In September 2017, after his ADAC Formula 4 victory, Vips tested Formula 3 machinery with Prema at Magny-Cours. In October he made his debut in the FIA Formula 3 European Championship as a guest driver, replacing absent Motopark driver Petru Florescu.

Vips secured a full-time seat with Motopark for the 2018 FIA Formula 3 European Championship. He took three pole positions and four race wins on his way to fourth place in the championship, behind teammate Dan Ticktum and Prema drivers Mick Schumacher and Robert Shwartzman. In November 2018, Vips made his first appearance at the Macau Grand Prix. He placed fourteenth in qualifying and improved to seventh in the qualification race. He maintained his position in the main race, finishing seventh, but was handed a 40-second time penalty for making an overtake under red-flag conditions, demoting him to nineteenth place.

In December 2018 it was announced that Vips would compete in the new FIA Formula 3 Championship, joining Hitech Grand Prix for the 2019 season. He took victory in the feature races at the Red Bull Ring and at Silverstone Circuit, the latter from pole position, and won the sprint race at the Sochi Autodrom. He ended the season fourth in the drivers' championship, behind the three Prema entries of Robert Shwartzman, Marcus Armstrong and Jehan Daruvala.

Vips continued with Hitech to contest the 2019 Macau Grand Prix. He set the fastest qualifying time – a new lap record – and converted pole position for the qualifying race into victory, putting him on pole for the main race. Vips led in the early part of the race, but crashes from Leonardo Pulcini and Ferdinand Habsburg nullified his lead as the safety car was deployed. He was overtaken by Richard Verschoor when the race resumed and finished in second place, 0.792 seconds behind Verschoor.

2020: Disrupted campaigns 
In October 2019, it was announced that Vips would replace Patricio O'Ward at Team Mugen for the final round of the 2019 Super Formula Championship. He qualified nineteenth and ran as high as fifth in the race. However, he stalled the car during his pit stop, losing around half a minute while sat stationary and causing him to drop to eighteenth by the finish. Vips re-joined Team Mugen in a December 2019 test at Suzuka. In January 2020, it was announced that Vips would drive for the team in the 2020 Super Formula Championship alongside Tomoki Nojiri. However, the start of the Super Formula season was postponed until August due to the COVID-19 pandemic, and the closure of Japan's borders to foreign nationals put Vips' ability to compete into doubt.

In June 2020, Vips took part in a Formula Regional European Championship (FREC) test at Imola with the Finnish KIC Motorsport team. He was then announced as part of the team's lineup for the 2020 season. Vips' manager Marko Asmer clarified that his Super Formula campaign was the priority, but that FREC would be a "back-up" if travel to Japan became impossible. Vips' first FREC race at Misano ended in retirement after a spin into the gravel.

Vips was ultimately unable to enter Japan in time for the first round of the Super Formula championship at Motegi. He was replaced at Team Mugen by Ukyo Sasahara. Shortly after claiming a double podium finish in the FREC round at Circuit Paul Ricard, Vips was called up to the FIA Formula 2 Championship to replace injured DAMS driver Sean Gelael. Vips finished narrowly outside the points in his first four races at Spa-Francorchamps and Monza. He scored first points of the season at Mugello where he finished seventh in the feature race and third in the sprint race. Formula 2 commitments forced Vips to miss the FREC round at the Red Bull Ring, but he returned to FREC at the following round at Mugello, claiming a second-place finish.

After missing the first three rounds, Vips was set to return to Super Formula for the fourth round at Autopolis, having successfully entered Japan and completed a two-week quarantine period. This caused him to miss the fifth and sixth rounds of FREC, limiting his chances of earning FIA Super Licence points through that series. However, on the week before the race at Autopolis, Team Mugen confirmed that Vips would not take part in any of the remaining rounds. Formula One team Red Bull Racing later revealed that Vips had been recalled from Super Formula to complete testing and reserve driver duties.

FIA Formula 2 Championship

2021 

In January 2021, it was announced that Vips would make his full-time Formula 2 debut, contesting the  season with Hitech Grand Prix alongside Liam Lawson. At the first round at the Bahrain International Circuit, Vips qualified 5th. However, he was excluded from qualifying due to a technical infringement. Vips charged from the back all the way to tenth. Progressing to tenth place in the opening race earnt him reverse-grid pole position for the second race. He survived an attack from Lirim Zendeli at the race start. He finally succumbed to the lead on lap 5 after Guanyu Zhou passed him. On lap 15, the safety car was brought out and Vips made the choice to pit for fresher tyres. But with less than 3 laps to go, whilst running in 2nd place, Vips suffered a gearbox issue that fell him to 16th at the flag. The feature race saw little for Vips, ending the race in 13th. He ended the round without scoring points, describing his luck as "laughable". In Monaco, Vips finished 5th in the first sprint, holding off Dan Ticktum in the closing stages. The second sprint saw Vips finish the race in fourth place after going past Theo Pourchaire on lap 24 of 30. However when Lawson was disqualified, Vips was promoted to third, hence scoring his first podium for Hitech.

At the third round at the Baku City Circuit, Vips qualified a season best 2nd, locking up a Hitech front row alongside Lawson on pole. He finished 7th in the sprint race 1, having missed 7th place to Marcus Armstrong by less than a tenth. Vips claimed his maiden win the next race, passing Bent Viscaal and David Beckmann en route to victory in Formula 2's 100th race. He described his victory as "redemption" and "relief" after his misfortune in Bahrain. Vips won once again, holding off Oscar Piastri by a second during the feature race. In doing so, Vips became the first driver to win two Formula 2 races in a weekend.
This raised him into fourth in the championship. Vips started 2nd in the first sprint at Silverstone Circuit and jumped Christian Lundgaard at the start. Ultimately they were both jumped by Prema's Robert Shwartzman who took the lead. Vips was unable to pass Shwartzman and settled for second place. The next two races yielded 6th and 7th for Vips.

Vips qualified 9th in Monza, hence would start 2nd for sprint race 1. He took the lead from Beckmann into the first corner. He would keep the lead until lap 15, when Pourchaire passed him. Things went downhill for Vips from then on in the race, as he would struggle and fall to 8th. Vips retired on lap 7 in the feature race following a mechanical issue with his car. In Sochi Autodrom, Vips obtained second place in the first sprint in mixed conditions, unable to pressure race winner Dan Ticktum throughout the race. Vips did not finish the feature race, due to a mechanical failure once again. He voiced out that he was "very frustrated" and considered reliability to be "a bit of a joke".

Vips took 3rd place in the inaugural race at Jeddah Street Circuit. Having starting at the same position in the first sprint, he lost the position  to Ralph Boschung before reclaiming the position on lap 10. He did not finish the second sprint after making contact with Drugovich and ripping off his front wing in the process. Vips would go on to finish 6th in the red-flagged feature race. The season finale at Abu Dhabi yielded little for Vips, as he qualified poorly in 15th. He was unable to progress in the sprint races, finishing 12th in the first one. He retired in the second sprint following contact with newly champion Piastri. He managed to recover in the feature race, finishing 8th after passing a few drivers in the later stages on fresher tyres. Vips finished the 2021 season in 6th place with 120 points, three places higher than teammate Lawson. During the season, Vips netted a total of 2 wins, 6 podiums and a fastest lap.

2022 

Formula One
In October 2018, Vips was linked to a place in the Red Bull Junior Team. He was confirmed with the program the following month prior to the Macau Grand Prix.

In November 2020, Vips received his FIA Super Licence after completing a 300 km test with Red Bull Racing, driving the Red Bull RB8 at the Silverstone Circuit. He served as a reserve driver for Red Bull and sister team AlphaTauri at the Turkish, Bahrain, Sakhir and Abu Dhabi Grands Prix. He took part in the end-of-season Abu Dhabi young driver test with Red Bull, driving the RB16. He again took part in the Abu Dhabi young driver test at the end of the  season, driving the RB16B.

He made his Formula One free practice debut with Red Bull at the 2022 Spanish Grand Prix, taking Sergio Pérez's place.

In June 2022, Vips was suspended by Red Bull pending an investigation after he was heard using the word "nigga" on a Twitch livestream. His contract with Red Bull Racing and the Red Bull Junior Team was terminated on 28 June following the completion of the investigation. He was replaced as reserve driver by Liam Lawson. On July 6, Christian Horner, Red Bull's team principal, made some statements that implied that they would continue to support Jüri Vips "from a mental health and educational perspective" since "everybody at some point deserves a second chance" and that he would continue in the Red Bull Junior Team, even if his contract as a reserve and test driver was terminated. However, on July 19, Helmut Marko confirmed that Vips was no longer receiving support of any kind from Red Bull.

IndyCar Series 
In October 2022 Vips took part in a private IndyCar driver evaluation test at Sebring with Rahal Letterman Lanigan Racing. He was second fastest out of the 5 participants, three tenths off Tom Blomqvist. On 13 March 2023, Vips participated in a second IndyCar test with Rahal Letterman Lanigan Racing at Barber, replacing Jack Harvey who was deemed unfit following an injury at the Grand Prix of St. Petersburg.

Karting record

Karting career summary

Racing record

Racing career summary 

† As Vips had not competed in the required number of rounds, he was ineligible for a championship position.‡ As Vips was a guest driver, he was ineligible for points.

Complete ADAC Formula 4 Championship results 
(key) (Races in bold indicate pole position) (Races in italics indicate fastest lap)

Complete Italian F4 Championship results 
(key) (Races in bold indicate pole position) (Races in italics indicate fastest lap)

† Vips did not compete in the required number of rounds to be eligible for a championship position.

Complete MRF Challenge Formula 2000 Championship results 
(key) (Races in bold indicate pole position; races in italics indicate fastest lap)

Complete FIA Formula 3 European Championship results 
(key) (Races in bold indicate pole position) (Races in italics indicate fastest lap)

† As Vips was a guest driver, he was ineligible for points.

Complete Macau Grand Prix results

Complete FIA Formula 3 Championship results 
(key) (Races in bold indicate pole position; races in italics indicate points for the fastest lap of top ten finishers)

Complete Super Formula results 
(key) (Races in bold indicate pole position) (Races in italics indicate fastest lap)

Complete FIA Formula 2 Championship results
(key) (Races in bold indicate pole position) (Races in italics indicate points for the fastest lap of top ten finishers)

‡ Half points awarded as less than 75% of race distance was completed.

Complete Formula One participations 
(key) (Races in bold indicate pole position) (Races in italics indicate fastest lap)

References

External links 
 
 

2000 births
Living people
Estonian racing drivers
People from Tallinn
Italian F4 Championship drivers
ADAC Formula 4 drivers
ADAC Formula 4 champions
MRF Challenge Formula 2000 Championship drivers
FIA Formula 3 European Championship drivers
FIA Formula 3 Championship drivers
Super Formula drivers
Formula Regional European Championship drivers
FIA Formula 2 Championship drivers
Prema Powerteam drivers
Motopark Academy drivers
Hitech Grand Prix drivers
Mugen Motorsports drivers
DAMS drivers
KIC Motorsport drivers
Karting World Championship drivers